Kuttapathram is a 1991 Indian Malayalam film, directed and produced by R. Chandru. The film stars Suresh Gopi, Sreeja, Babu Antony and Jagathy Sreekumar in the lead roles. The film has musical score by Rajamani.

Cast

Suresh Gopi as Alex
Sreeja as  Shirley
Babu Antony as  Vicky
Jagathy Sreekumar as  Viswambharan
Innocent as Innocent
Baiju as  Tony
Mahesh as  Mahesh
Rajan P. Dev as  Augustine Fernandez
Krishnankutty Nair as  Mithran
Ganesh Kumar as  Peter
Jalaja as  Geetha
Kollam Thulasi as  Adv. Narendran
Shivaji as  SI Aravindan
Valsala Menon as  Clara
Vijayaraghavan as  Sethu

Soundtrack
The music was composed by Rajamani and the lyrics were written by Mankombu Gopalakrishnan.

References

External links
 

1991 films
1990s Malayalam-language films